Aerides rosea is a species of epiphytic orchid. It is native to China (Guangxi, Guizhou, Yunnan), Assam, Bhutan, Cambodia, India, Laos, Myanmar, Thailand and Vietnam.

References

External links 
 The Orchidologist
 The Orchid Species
 Thai Orchid Network
 Orchids of Cambodia

rosea
Orchids of Vietnam
Orchids of Thailand
Flora of Indo-China
Flora of the Indian subcontinent
Orchids of Yunnan
Flora of Guizhou
Flora of Guangxi
Epiphytic orchids
Plants described in 1851